Edward Hartopp may refer to:

Sir Edward Hartopp, 1st Baronet (c.1583–1652), of the Hartopp baronets, MP for Leicestershire
Sir Edward Hartopp, 2nd Baronet (c.1608–1658), of the Hartopp baronets
 Edward Bourchier Hartopp (1808–68), English Conservative MP for North Leicestershire 1859–68
 Edward Hartopp (cricketer) (1820–1894), English cricketer

See also
Hartopp (surname)